Eldorado Recording Studios is a recording studio in Burbank, California originally established in 1954 at the corner of Hollywood and Vine as a workshop for Johnny Otis. In 1987, following damage the building sustained from numerous earthquakes, Eldorado moved to the late Marvin Gaye's former studio on Sunset Boulevard, where many albums were recorded during the alternative rock and grunge-era (1989 to 1996). In 1996, the studio then relocated to its current Burbank facilities which were designed and built from the ground up by Steven Klein.

Albums or simply tracks were recorded at Eldorado by Canned Heat, Slayer, Brian Eno, Talking Heads, Red Hot Chili Peppers, Herbie Hancock, Jane's Addiction, Social Distortion, Alice in Chains, MxPx, The Offspring, Beowülf, Against Me!, Head Automatica, Avenged Sevenfold, My Chemical Romance, Anthrax, Kreator, Icehouse.

Eldorado is a full-service studio. Having served as "home base" to producer Dave Jerden from 1981 to 2004, Eldorado now caters to a variety of producers, engineers and artists.

Recordings made at Eldorado

References

External links
 

Recording studios in California
Music of Los Angeles
Entertainment companies based in California
Companies based in Burbank, California
Mass media companies established in 1954
1954 establishments in California